James Neil Lang (2 May 1900 – 1973) was an English first-class cricketer who played eight matches for Worcestershire in the early 1920s.  He was born in Ludlow, Shropshire and died at Birmingham, Warwickshire.

Lang was not particularly successful, averaging over 50 with his left-arm spin and never reaching double figures with the bat. His first victim was Hampshire's Harold Gilligan, while his most successful game was his last, against Nottinghamshire, when he took three wickets including that of Wally Hammond.

References

External links
 

1900 births
1973 deaths
Sportspeople from Ludlow
English cricketers
Worcestershire cricketers